FIA ETCR – eTouring Car World Cup is a touring car series for electric cars. During the inaugural season in 2021, the series called itself Pure ETCR and featured cars from three manufacturers competing at five different locations. Starting with the 2022 season, ETCR becomes an official FIA series.

History

The electric touring car series was presented together with the CUPRA 'e-Racer' car ahead of the 2018 Geneva Motor Show by TCR promoter WSC Ltd. In September 2019, Hyundai became the second manufacturer to commit to creating an ETCR car, the 'Veloster N ETCR', and in December the Italian team Romeo Ferraris announced that they will build an Alfa Romeo Giulia according to ETCR specifications.

In February 2020, the series was rebranded as 'Pure ETCR' and a calendar of demonstration events for 2020 was presented. However, due to the COVID-19 pandemic, development and testing was delayed by several months, making the original plan unfeasible. The series' official launch event eventually took place on 9 October in Copenhagen, where Hyundai Motorsport was officially announced as a competitor. A demonstration of the starting gates and the Hyundai Veloster was held during the WTCR event at the MotorLand Aragón in Spain on 13 November 2020. On the same weekend, Romeo Ferraris revealed their ETCR version of the Alfa Romeo Giulia.

The calendar for the inaugural season was announced in February 2021. The first Pure ETCR started on 18–20 June at the Autodromo Vallelunga in Italy, and ended in October at Circuit Pau-Arnos. Swedish driver Mattias Ekström was crowned champion of the season, while Cupra won the manufacturer's championship.

Since 2022, the series has FIA World Cup status and drivers and manufacturers compete for the FIA eTouring Car World Cup.

Specifications

ETCR cars use spec powertrains supplied by the series organizers, with manufacturers using their own bodywork. The common kit includes motors, gearbox, inverter, battery, ECU and cooling system; ETCR technical regulations require a single-speed rear-drive chassis with McPherson strut front suspension and double wishbone rear suspension.

The electric drivetrain unit (EDU) is capable of electronic torque vectoring by varying the power to each rear wheel. Inverter, motor, and gearbox are supplied by MAGELEC Propulsion.

The battery, developed by Williams Advanced Engineering, has a capacity of 62 kWh, operating at a voltage of 798 V. According to Williams, it can be charged from 10% to 90% state of charge in one hour on a 60 kW charger. Williams also supply the vehicle control modules.

Race format
The ETCR race format is different from standard touring car races, but instead, similar to a rallycross format with several rounds of short races and an elimination process leading to a final. The individual races are called 'battles' and are started from an opening gate and last for only a few laps. Each driver has a ‘push-to-pass’ power boost and a smaller ‘fightback’ boost for trying to reclaim a position. Between the battles, cars return to a central ‘energy station’ where they can be recharged.

Champions

Teams and cars
As of November 2020, four teams have announced their participation in the series, each developing a different car. Commitments from one more brand have been received, but not yet announced.

See also
 Electric motorsport
 FIA Electric GT Championship
 World Touring Car Cup

References

External links
 Official website

Green racing
Touring car racing series
Electric vehicles